Acidimicrobium ferrooxidans is a bacterium, the type species of its genus. It is a ferrous-iron-oxidizing, moderately thermophilic and acidophilic bacterium.

References

Further reading
Clum, Alicia, et al. "Complete genome sequence of Acidimicrobium ferrooxidans type strain (ICPT)." Standards in Genomic Sciences 1.1 (2009): 38.

Whitman, William B., et al., eds. Bergey's manual® of systematic bacteriology. Vol. 5. Springer, 2012.

External links 

LPSN
Type strain of Acidimicrobium ferrooxidans at BacDive -  the Bacterial Diversity Metadatabase

Actinomycetota
Bacteria described in 1996
Thermophiles